James William "Sparkplug" Keenan (May 25, 1899 – June 5, 1980) was a Major League Baseball pitcher who played for the Philadelphia Phillies in  and .

External links

Philadelphia Phillies players
1899 births
1980 deaths
Major League Baseball pitchers
Baseball players from New York (state)
People from Avon, New York
Nashville Vols players